Veronica Strang is an author and professor of anthropology affiliated to Oxford University. Her work combines cultural anthropology with environmental studies, and focuses on the relationship between human communities and their environments. Strang's publications include the books 'The Meaning of Water' (Berg 2004); Gardening the World: agency, identity, and the ownership of water' (Berghahn 2009); 'What Anthropologists Do' (Routledge 2009, 2021), 'Water Nature and Culture' (Reaktion 2015) and most recently 'Water Beings: from nature worship to the environmental crisis' (Reaktion 2023), which is based on a major comparative study of water deities around the world. Further information is available on her website at: https://www.veronicastrang.com/

Background 
Strang completed her PhD at Oxford in 1995, and this led to the publication of Uncommon Ground: cultural landscapes and environmental values (Berg 1997). Between 1994 and 1997, Strang taught at the Department of Anthropology and the Pitt Rivers Museum, while also conducting research at Oxford's Environmental Change Institute. She then helped to establish a new Anthropology Department at the University of Wales in Lampeter. 

In 2000, Strang received an award for the Royal Anthropological Institute Fellowship in Urgent Anthropology. She moved to New Zealand shortly after this to take up professorial posts at Auckland University of Technology and then Auckland University, and this enabled further research on water issues in New Zealand and Australia. 

Strang returned to the UK in 2012 to take up a role as the Executive Director of Durham University's Institute of Advanced Study. She also served as the Chair of the Association of Social Anthropologists of the UK and the Commonwealth from 2012 to 2017. She is now based in Oxford.

Scholarship 
Much of Strang's work focuses on people's beliefs and values in relation to water, and how these drive sustainable or unsustainable practices. Her publication, The Meaning of Water, has become a key text in this area, and she has since worked on multiple projects that examine how different groups, including indigenous communities, engage with water.

Being founded in cultural anthropology Strang's work maintains a close interest in how material culture and the materiality of water. Her work is also interdisciplinary, drawing on archaeology, history, theology, psychology and the cognitive sciences. As the director of a research institute spanning the entire academic spectrum (2012-2022), she has also written extensively about interdisciplinarity itself, and she continues to encourage collaborative research as an advisor to a number of institutes and funding councils internationally. 

Strang has done considerable work on water issues with UNESCO and with the United Nations, most recently working with the UN's High Level Panel on Water providing input about cultural and spiritual issues in relation to water. She has also assisted indigenous communities in Australia, and the Maori Council, with land and water claims, so may be considered as a public anthropologist. In keeping with this, her research aims for outcomes that are for the benefit of the environment and for the communities with whom she works.

Recognition 

 Royal Anthropological Institute Fellowship in Urgent Anthropology, 2000
 International Water Prize, UNESCO, 2007
 HEFCE's national Interdisciplinary Advisory Panel Fellowship, 2017
 Chair of the Association of Social Anthropologists of the UK, 2013–2017
 Election as Fellow of the Academy of Social Sciences, 2019.

Selected publications 
Authored books

 Strang. V. (2023). Water Beings: from nature worship to the environmental crisis. Reaktion Press. 
 Strang, V. ([2009]2021). What Anthropologists Do. Oxford, New York: Berg/Bloomsbury.
 Strang, V. (2015). Water, Nature and Culture. Reaktion Books/University of Chicago Press.
 Strang, V. (2009). Gardening the World: agency, identity, and the ownership of water. New York & Oxford: Berghahn.
 Strang, V. (2004). The Meaning of Water. Oxford, New York: Berg/Bloomsbury.

Edited volumes

Strang, V., Edensor, T. and Puckering, J. (eds) (2018). From the Lighthouse: interdisciplinary reflections on light. London: Routledge.
Johnston, B., Hiwasaki, L., Klaver, I., Ramos-Castillo, A., Strang, V. (eds) (2012). Water, Cultural Diversity and Global Environmental Change: Emerging Trends, Sustainable Futures?. Paris: Springer and UNESCO. 

Edited journals

 Krause, F. and Strang, V. (eds) (2016). Thinking Relationships Through Water, Special Issue, Society and Natural Resources, 29 (6). 
 Krause, F. and Strang, V. (eds) (2013). Living Water: the powers and politics of a vital substance, Special Issue, Worldviews: Global Religions, Culture and Ecology. 17(2).

Journal articles

Strang, V. (2023). ‘The Hard Way: volatility and stability in the Brisbane River delta’, T. Hylland Eriksen and F. Krause (eds), Making and Unmaking Volatility: contextualising crises in deltaic lifeworlds, Special Issue, Social Anthropology, 31(2).  
Kopnina, H. and Strang, V. (2022). ‘Water Management: examining pragmatic and ethical issues for species-inclusive and sustainable water policies’, in She Hawke and Reingard Spannring (eds) Critical Inter-disciplinary Approaches to Water Sustainability and Climate Change Issues. Special Issue, Visions of Sustainability, 18, 7079 pp. 01-21.
Strang, V. (2021). ‘Gender and Pan-Species Democracy in the Anthropocene’, C. Notermans and A. Tonnaer (eds), Gender, Nature and Religious Re-enchantment in the Anthropocene, Special Issue, Religions, 12:x. https://doi.org/10.3390/xxxxx
Strang, V. (2021. ‘A Sustainable Future for Water’, Aqua: Journal of the International Water Association, 70(4) pp. 404-419.  https://doi.org/10.2166/aqua.2020.101
Strang, V. (2016). ‘Infrastructural Relations: water, political power and the rise of a new ‘despotic regime’, in Water Alternatives, Special Issue. Water, Infrastructure and Political Rule. 9(2): 292-318.
Strang, V. (2015). ‘On the Matter of Time’, in Interdisciplinary Science Reviews, 40(2) pp 101-123.
Strang, V. (2014). ‘Fluid Consistencies: meaning and materiality in human engagements with water’, in Archaeological Dialogues, 21 (2) pp 133–150. 
Strang, V. (2014). ‘The Taniwha and the Crown: defending water rights in Aotearoa/New Zealand’, in WIREs Water. Wiley. 1. pp 121-131. Published Online: Dec 03 2013. DOI: 10.1002/wat2.1002
Strang, V. (2014). ‘Lording it Over the Goddess: water, gender and human-environmental relations’, in Journal of Feminist Studies in Religion, 30(1) pp 83-107. 

Chapters in books

Book chapters
Strang, V. (2022). ‘Seeing Through the Rainbow: Aboriginal Australian concepts of an ordered universe’ in Order Into Action: large-scale categories of order in the pre-modern world. Cursor mundi series, eds. K. Oschema and Christoph Mauntel, Turnhout, Belgium: Brepols Publishers. pp. 263-289.
Strang, V. (2022). ‘Identity and Agency’, in Cambridge University Press Handbook of Material Culture Studies, eds. L. De Cunzo and C. Roeber, Cambridge: Cambridge University Press. 
Strang, V. (2021). ‘Leadership in Principle: Uniting Nations to recognize the cultural value of water’, in Hydrohumanities: water discourse and environmental futures, eds. K. De Wolff, R. Faletti and I. López-Calvo, California: University of California Press. pp. 215-241.
Strang, V. (2021). ‘Human and Non-Human Rights to Water’, in Oxford Research Encylopedia of Anthropology, ed. M. Aldenderfer Oxford: Oxford University Press.   
Strang, V. (2020). ‘Materialising the State: the meaning of water infrastructure’, in Shifting States: new perspectives on security, infrastructure and political affect, eds. A. Dundon and R. Vokes, ASA Monograph, London, New York: Bloomsbury Press. pp 43-61. 
Strang, V. (2020). ‘The Rights of the River: water, culture and ecological justice’, in Conservation: integrating social and ecological justice, eds. H. Kopnina and H. Washington, New York: Springer. pp 105-119.   
Strang, V. (2019). ‘Water’, in Cambridge Encyclopedia of Anthropology, eds. F. Stein, S. Lazar, R. Stasch, J. Robbins, A. Sanchez, M. Candea and H. Diemberger, Cambridge University: open access.   
Strang, V. (2019). ‘The Meaning of Water to Health: antipodean perspectives on the ‘substance of life’’, in Blue Space, Health and Wellbeing, eds. R. Foley, R. Kearns, T. Kisteman, B. Wheeler. Geographies of Health Book Series, London: Routledge, Taylor and Francis. pp 21-37.      
Strang, V. (2018). ‘Water Rights’ in The International Encyclopedia of Anthropology, ed. H. Callan, New Jersey: John Wiley.
Strang, V. (2017). ‘The Gaia Complex: ethical challenges to an anthropocentric ‘common future’’, in The Anthropology of Sustainability: beyond development and progress, eds. M. Brightman and J. Lewis, London, New York: Palgrave. pp. 207-228. 
Strang, V. (2017). ‘Re-Imagined Communities: the transformational potential of interspecies ethnography in water policy development’, in The Oxford Handbook on Water Politics and Policy, eds. Ken Conca and Erika Weinthal, Oxford, New York: Oxford University Press. pp. 142-164.   
Strang, V. (2016). ‘Justice for All: inconvenient truths and reconciliation in human-non-human relations’ in Routledge International Handbook of Environmental Anthropology, eds. H. Kopnina and E. Shoreman-Ouimet, London, New York: Routledge. pp 263-278. 
Strang, V. (2015). ‘Reflecting Nature: water beings in history and imagination’, in Waterworlds: anthropology in fluid environments, eds. K. Hastrup and F. Hastrup, Oxford, New York: Berghahn. pp 248-278.   
Strang, V. (2013). ‘Conceptual Relations: water, ideologies and theoretical subversions’, in Thinking With Water, eds. C. Chen, J. Macleod and A. Neimanis, Montreal: McGill-Queens University Press. pp 185-211.   
Strang, V. (2013). ‘Dam Nation: Cubbie Station and the waters of the Darling’, in The Social Life of Water in a Time of Crisis, ed. J. Wagner, Oxford, New York: Berghahn. pp 36-60.

References 

Alumni of the University of Oxford
Year of birth missing (living people)
Living people
British anthropologists
British women anthropologists
American anthropologists
American women anthropologists
Academic staff of the Auckland University of Technology
Academic staff of the University of Auckland
British expatriate academics
British expatriates in New Zealand
American women academics
21st-century American women writers
21st-century British women writers